Ralf Fährmann (born 27 September 1988) is a German professional footballer who plays as a goalkeeper for Bundesliga club Schalke 04.

Club career

Fährmann made his professional debut for Schalke 04 on 13 September 2008 in 3–3 draw away to Borussia Dortmund. On 16 September 2008, he played his first international match, against APOEL in a UEFA Cup tie.

At the end of the 2008–09 season, he left Schalke and moved to Eintracht Frankfurt on free transfer, signing a contract valid to 30 June 2012.

Fährmann returned to Schalke in 2011 after the team sold Manuel Neuer to Bayern Munich. In the 2011 DFL-Supercup, Fährmann was named Man of the Match. After 90 minutes, the game finished 0–0 and it went on directly to a penalty shootout. Fährmann saved two penalty kicks, one from Kevin Großkreutz and one from Ivan Perišić, thus allowing Schalke to raise the Supercup trophy for the first time in the club's history. In the start of the 2013–14 season, he was named second choice goalkeeper behind Timo Hildebrand. While Hildebrand was injured, he became the first choice goalkeeper and his impressive performances saw him keep the number one spot for the remainder of the season.

On 4 May 2014, Schalke announced that Fährmann extended his contract with Schalke until 30 June 2019.

Fährmann made his 200th appearance in all competitions for Schalke 04 on 18 April 2018 in a 0–1 home defeat to Eintracht Frankfurt in DFB-Pokal.

On 5 July 2019, Fährmann joined Norwich City on loan until the end of 2019–20 season. On 10 March 2020, he left Norwich and was loaned to SK Brann until 30 June 2020. On 23 April 2020, he left for Germany due to the COVID-19 pandemic. On 9 June, Brann confirmed that Fährmann would not return for the last day of the loan contract, so he did not play a competitive game for the club.

International career
Fährmann is a former member of several Germany national youth football teams.

Personal life
Fährmann attended the Gesamtschule Berger Feld. His brother Falk Fährmann is also a goalkeeper, who played for FSV Zwickau.

Career statistics

Club

Honours
Schalke 04
DFL-Supercup: 2011
2. Bundesliga: 2021–22

References

External links

Profile at the FC Schalke 04 website

1988 births
Living people
People educated at the Gesamtschule Berger Feld
Sportspeople from Chemnitz
German footballers
Footballers from Saxony
Association football goalkeepers
Germany under-21 international footballers
Germany youth international footballers
Bundesliga players
2. Bundesliga players
Regionalliga players
Premier League players
FC Schalke 04 players
FC Schalke 04 II players
Eintracht Frankfurt players
Eintracht Frankfurt II players
Norwich City F.C. players
SK Brann players
German expatriate footballers
German expatriate sportspeople in England
Expatriate footballers in England
German expatriate sportspeople in Norway
Expatriate footballers in Norway